Saint Urho is a fictional saint of Finland, created and elaborated by Finnish Americans in Northern Minnesota in the 1950s, to celebrate their heritage and extend celebrations of St. Patrick's Day. His celebration day is set to March 16, the day before the March 17 feast day of St. Patrick. St. Patrick's feast day is celebrated by Irish Americans, of whom there are also many in Minnesota.

Creation 
The legend of Saint Urho was the invention of a Finnish American named Richard Mattson, who worked at Ketola's Department Store in Virginia, Minnesota in the spring of 1956. Mattson later recounted that he invented St. Urho when he was questioned by coworker Gene McCavic about the Finns' lack of a saint like the Irish St. Patrick, whose feat of casting the snakes out of Ireland is remembered on St. Patrick's Day. In fact, the patron saint of Finland (except for the Orthodox Church of Finland) is the bishop Saint Henry, whose feast day occurs on January 19.

According to the original "Ode to St. Urho" written by Gene McCavic and Richard Mattson, St. Urho was supposed to have cast "tose 'Rogs" (those frogs) out of Finland by the power of his loud voice, which he obtained by drinking "feelia sour" (sour whole milk) and eating "kala mojakka" (fish soup). The selection of the name Urho as the saint's name was probably influenced by the accession of Urho Kekkonen to the presidency of Finland in 1956. (Similarly, St. Urho's Pub in Töölö, Helsinki, is known to have received its name from Urho Kekkonen and has nothing to do with Saint Urho). Urho in the Finnish language also has the meaning of hero or simply brave.

The original "Ode to St. Urho" identified St. Urho's Day as taking place on May 24. Later the date was changed to March 16, the day before St. Patrick's Day so the Finns could start drinking green beer a day before the Irish. St. Urho's feast is supposed to be celebrated by wearing the colors Royal Purple and Nile Green.  Other details of the invented legend also changed, apparently under the influence of Dr. Sulo Havumäki, a psychology professor at Bemidji State University in Bemidji, Minnesota. The legend now states that St. Urho drove away grasshoppers (rather than frogs) from Finland using the incantation "Heinäsirkka, heinäsirkka, mene täältä helveteen!" ("Grasshopper, grasshopper, go from hence to Hell!"), thus saving the Finnish grape crops.
Another version of the modern celebration of St. Urho's Day is that it was created by Kenneth Brist of Chippewa Falls, Wisconsin.  Brist, a high school teacher, was teaching in the Upper Peninsula of Michigan in the early to mid-1950s in an area largely populated by people of Finnish heritage.  He and his friends concocted March 16 as St. Urho's Day so that they had two days to celebrate, the next day being St. Patrick's Day.

Ode to Saint Urho

Popularity
Brist promoted the "annual cancellation" of the St. Urho's Day Parade in Chippewa Falls with advertisements in the Chippewa Herald Telegram and by teaching his high school students about the legend of St. Urho.
The "Ode to St. Urho" has been modified to reflect these changes in the feast day and legend. The Ode is written in a self-parodying form of English as spoken by Finnish immigrants.  There is also a "Ballad of St. Urho" written by Sally Karttunen.

There are St. Urho fan clubs in Canada and Finland as well as the U.S., and the festival is celebrated on March 16 in many American and Canadian communities with Finnish roots.  The original statue of St. Urho is located in Menahga, Minnesota.  Another interesting chainsaw-carved St. Urho statue is located in Finland, Minnesota. A 2001 book, The Legend of St. Urho by Joanne Asala, presents much of the folklore surrounding St. Urho and includes an essay by Richard Mattson on the "birth" of St. Urho.

On March 16, 1999 in Kaleva, Michigan a large Metal Sculpture of a Grasshopper was dedicated in honor of St. Urho's day. Kaleva is a community settled by Finnish immigrants in 1900. Kaleva is named after the Kalevala, the Epic Finnish story about the Creation of the Earth.

Many places with mixed populations of Finnish and Irish have an annual St. Urho's day event on the night before St. Patrick's Day. Butte, Montana holds such a celebration each March 16.

Thunder Bay, Ontario, Canada, just north of Minnesota, is another location where St. Urho's Day is joyfully celebrated on the weekend nearest to March 16. The Finlandia Club is the headquarters for all that is Finnish in northern Ontario. A grasshopper slung on a pole is hauled through the streets in a parade through the streets near the Finlandia club where the celebration continues with food, music and dance.

Although St. Urho's Day is not widely known or celebrated in Finland, it has been celebrated in Turku since 1987. At the University of Turku students studying Folkloristics, Comparative Religion and Ethnology have organized a St. Urho's Day play yearly since 1987.

See also
 Culture of Finnish Americans
 Heikki Lunta

References 

Mascots introduced in 1956
Finnish-American culture in Minnesota
Fictional Christian saints